The 2016 Big West Conference men's basketball tournament took place from March 10–12, 2016 at the Honda Center in Anaheim, California. Hawaii won the tournament, defeating Long Beach State in the championship, and received the conference's automatic bid to the 2016 NCAA tournament. Cal State Northridge did not participate in the tournament due to a self-imposed postseason ban for academic fraud violations.

Seeds
The top 8 conference teams were eligible for the tournament. Teams were seeded by record within the conference, with a tiebreaker system to seed teams with identical conference records. Teams were reseeded after the Quarterfinals.

Schedule

Bracket

References

Big West Conference men's basketball tournament
Tournament
Big West Conference men's basketball tournament
Big West Conference men's basketball tournament